William Vincent Chamberlain (April 21, 1909 – February 6, 1994) was a Major League Baseball pitcher who played for the Chicago White Sox in .

Biography
Chamberlain grew up in Milton, Massachusetts, and played college baseball at Saint Anselm College. Chamberlain was pitching for Harwich in the Cape Cod Baseball League (CCBL) in the summer of 1932 when he was noticed by a White Sox scout. He was playing in Chicago by the end of the season.

In his only major league campaign, Chamberlain appeared in 12 games for the 1932 White Sox, posting a 4.57 ERA in 41.1 innings. He gave up three big league home runs, two to Baseball Hall of Famer Mickey Cochrane, and one that was the 200th home run of Hall of Famer Al Simmons' illustrious career. Perhaps Chamberlain's most memorable outing came on August 29 in the second game of a doubleheader against the New York Yankees at Yankee Stadium. In a 4-3 White Sox loss, Chamberlain held Babe Ruth and Lou Gehrig hitless over five innings, and helped his own cause with a single off Hall of Fame hurler Red Ruffing.

Chamberlain continued to play professionally in the minor leagues through 1938. While serving a one-month suspension from the New York–Pennsylvania League in 1937, he returned to play again for the CCBL's Harwich club. After his baseball career had ended, Chamberlain spent 30 years with the Boston Police Department, retiring in 1970.

References

External links

Bill Chamberlain biography from Society for American Baseball Research (SABR)

1909 births
1994 deaths
Chicago White Sox players
Major League Baseball pitchers
Baseball players from Massachusetts
Saint Anselm Hawks baseball players
Harwich Mariners players
Cape Cod Baseball League players (pre-modern era)
Boston Police Department officers